

Dandy Heat 

Dandy Heat is an indie rock band formed in Mcallen, TX in 2010. The band's primary members are Joseph Alexander Macias and Osmar Everardo Alanis-Monsivais, although other musicians join them during live shows.

History 

Macias and Alanis-Monsivais began playing together while attending Sharyland High School. In 2009 they formed a shoegaze band named Vulpes with drummer Michael Hernandez and guitarist/vocalist Luis Alvarez. In 2011, while working with this band, Macias and Alanis-Monsivais began recording several songs on their own.

Nights at the Island

The two musicians would regularly arrive early before Vulpes practices and recording sessions to compose several songs. Although these songs were often created to test out their recording equipment, they were eventually collected in October 2011 into an album titled Nights at the Island.

In 2012 Macias and Alanis-Monsivais joined South Texas punk duo, Jungle Bodies. This, along with work on Vulpes music, led Nights at the Island to be shelved indefinitely. It wasn't until mid 2013, two years after the album had been completed, that Macias and Alanis-Monsivais were encouraged to play their first show as Dandy Heat. A short series of shows with bands such as Widowspeak,  Quiet Kids, Sick Sea and Spray Paint followed.

Sentimental Beast 

On September 20, 2014, Dandy Heat played their last show before work on their second album began. While progress on the album, titled Sentimental Beast, has been slow, a few new releases have surfaced on the band's Facebook page  and Spotify profile. As of mid-2016, following the breakup of Jungle Bodies and Vulpes, the band has steadily been working on new material. The band expects to release Sentimental Beast in late 2016.

Band Members

Primary Members 

Joseph Alexander Macias – (2011 – Present)

Osmar Everardo Alanis-Monsivais – (2011 – Present)

Jose Galvan – Drums (2013 – Present)

Eric Vasquez – Guitar (2013 – Present)

Fabian Vasquez – Bass (2013 – Present)

Previous Members 

Ronnie Rios – Keyboard (2013)

Andres Sanchez – Guitar (2013)

Discography 

•	Nights at the Island - LP (2011)

•	Growing Pains/I Hate You – EP (2015)

•	Toxic Dreaming – Single (2016)

References

External links 
 Dandy Heat on Facebook
 Dandy Heat on Twitter
 Dandy Heat on Instagram

Indie rock musical groups from Texas